The Women competition at the 2017 World Championships was held on 24 and 25 February 2017.

Results
The first two runs were held on 24 February 2017, with the second run being cancelled due to snow, and the last two runs on 25 February 2017.

References

Women